Thomas Hood (fl. 1419–1423) of Leominster, Herefordshire, was an English politician.

His sons were also MPs: William and Walter Hood. His father was John Hood, also an MP for Leominster.

He was a Member (MP) of the Parliament of England for Leominster in 1419, 1420, December 1421 and 1423.

References

Year of birth missing
15th-century deaths
English MPs 1419
People from Herefordshire
English MPs 1420
English MPs December 1421
English MPs 1423